North Carolina Highway 57 (NC 57) is a  primary state highway in the U.S. state of North Carolina and a semi-rural traffic artery connecting Roxboro to a few small-to-medium-sized towns in The Triangle region north of the cities of Durham and Chapel Hill.

Route description
NC 57 begins at the junction with NC 86 just north of Hillsborough. It heads northeast through Orange County, passing through Schley and intersecting NC 157 in Caldwell. The route crosses into Person County and then runs concurrent with US 501 heading north through Timberlake and Somerset. Upon entering Roxboro, NC 57 and US 501 become concurrent with US 158 before entering town. The three routes intersect the northern terminus of NC 157 at the intersection of Main Street and at Long Avenue, US 158 splits from the NC 57/US 501 concurrency. At Leasburg Road, NC 57 splits from US 501 and then runs concurrent with NC 49, heading west and running concurrent with US 158 again before splitting from the NC 49/US 158 concurrency at the Concord Road intersection. The route continues to the northwest, going through Olive hill and passing by Hyco Lake before passing through Semora and intersecting NC 119. It continues to the northwest and then it enters Milton before reaching its northern terminus at the intersection with NC 62.

History
During the 1920s, NC 57 originally ran east–west from Roxboro to Henderson along present day US 158. By 1940, the highway was changed to its current route.

Major intersections

See also
 North Carolina Bicycle Route 4 - Concurrent with NC 57 from downtown Roxboro to Kelly Brewer Road at Hyco Lake

References

External links

 
 NCRoads.com: N.C. 57

057
Transportation in Orange County, North Carolina
Transportation in Person County, North Carolina
Transportation in Caswell County, North Carolina